Puncturella longifissa, the long-slot puncturella, is a species of sea snail, a marine gastropod mollusk in the family Fissurellidae, the keyhole limpets and slit limpets.

William Healey Dall described the species in 1914; he found specimens off Bering Island in the Bering Sea. It has also been found off  Amchitka and Adak.

References

External links
 To USNM Invertebrate Zoology Mollusca Collection

Fissurellidae
Taxa named by William Healey Dall
Gastropods described in 1914